2016 Mongolian First League (often referred to as the 2016 Mongolian 1st League) is Second-highest division of the Mongolia.

Participating Teams

Arvis FC
Athletic 220 FC
Baganuur KhK
Beşiktaş
DMYu FC
Gepro FC
Goyo FC
Şaryn Gol FC
Soëmbyn Barsuud FC
Western FC

Promoted Teams

With 16 wins, 1 draw and 6 loss the Goyo FC team added 49 points and finished the competition in first place. With that, in addition to the title of champion of the competition, the team won the right to compete in the Mongolian Premier League next season.

With only seven points less, team Athletic 220 FC finished the competition in second place and was also promoted to the Mongolian Premier League. The team managed to add 42 points with 13 wins, 3 draws and 2 losses.

Demoted Teams

With three wins, and 15 losses, the Baganuur KhK FC team scored just 9 points and was relegated together with the debuting DMYu FC team who had 16 defeats and 2 wins.

Final classification

 1.Goyo FC                     18  16  1  1         49  Promoted
 2.Athletic 220 FC             18  13  3  2         42  Promoted

 3.Soëmbyn Barsuud             18  11  1  6         34  [R]
 4.Şaryn Gol                   18  11  0  7         33
 5.Arvis                       18   9  2  7              29
 6.Beşiktaş                    18   8  2  8         26
 7.Western                     18   6  5  7         23
 8.Gepro FC                    18   4  0 14         12

 9.Baganuur KhK                18   3  0 15          9  Relegated
10.DMYu                        18   2  0 16          6  Relegated

References

3
Sports leagues established in 2016